The Apostolic Nunciature to Georgia is an ecclesiastical office of the Catholic Church in Georgia. It is a diplomatic post of the Holy See, whose representative is called the Apostolic Nuncio with the rank of an ambassador.

Representatives of the Holy See to Georgia
Apostolic nuncios
Jean-Paul Gobel (7 December 1993 - 6 December 1997)
Peter Stephan Zurbriggen (13 June 1998 - 25 October 2001)
Claudio Gugerotti (7 December 2001 - 15 July 2011)
Marek Solczyński (26 November 2011 - 25 April 2017)
José Avelino Bettencourt (8 March 2018 - present)

See also
Foreign relations of the Holy See
List of diplomatic missions of the Holy See

References

External link
 

Georgia
 
Georgia (country)–Holy See relations